{{Infobox football club
| nickname = Azulão do Mutange (Mutange's Big Blue)Azulão das Alagoas (Alagoas' Big Blue)Alviceleste (The White & Blue)Papão de Títulosmaior de alagoas (Boogeyman of Titles)Orgulho Alagoano (Alagoas' Pride)Todo Poderoso (The Almighty)
| ground = Rei Pelé
| capacity = 19,105
| clubname = CSA
| image = CSA_escudo.png
| upright = 0.8
| fullname = Centro Sportivo Alagoano
| founded = 
| chairman = Rafael Tenório
| manager = Alberto Valentim
| league = Campeonato Brasileiro Série CCampeonato Alagoano
| season = 20222022
| position = Série B, 17th of 20 (relegated)Alagoano, 3rd of 8
| website = http://www.csaoficial.com.br/
| pattern_la1 = _csa22h
| pattern_b1 = _csa22h
| pattern_ra1 = _csa22h
| pattern_sh1 = _whitesides
| pattern_so1 = _csa22hl
| leftarm1 = 0000FF
| body1 = FFFFFF
| rightarm1 = 0000FF
| shorts1 = 0000FF
| socks1 = 0000FF
| pattern_la2 = _csa22a
| pattern_b2 = _csa22a
| pattern_ra2 = _csa22a
| pattern_sh2 = _csa22a
| pattern_so2 = _csa22al
| leftarm2 = FFFFFF
| body2 = FFFFFF
| rightarm2 = FFFFFF
| shorts2 = FFFFFF
| socks2 = FFFFFF
| pattern_la3 = _csa22t
| pattern_b3 = _csa22t
| pattern_ra3 = _csa22t
| pattern_sh3 = _csa22t
| pattern_so3 = _csa22t
| leftarm3 = 000066
| body3 = 000066
| rightarm3 = 000066
| shorts3 = 000066
| socks3 = 000066
| mgrtitle = Head coach
}}

Centro Sportivo Alagoano, commonly referred to as CSA, is a Brazilian professional football club based in Maceió, Alagoas. It competes in the Série C, the third tier of Brazilian football, as well as in the Campeonato Alagoano, the top flight of the Alagoas state football league.

Founded on 7 September 1913, the home stadium is the Gustavo Paiva stadium, which has a capacity of 9,000. CSA's greatest rival is CRB.

In 1976, Fernando Collor de Mello, who later was elected president of Brazil, was the club's chairman. Brazilian singer Djavan played for CSA as a midfielder before he decided to become a singer.

History
On 7 September 1913, the same day as the anniversary of the Brazilian Independence from Portugal, the club was founded as Centro Sportivo Sete de Setembro. In 1914, Centro Sportivo Sete de Setembro was renamed to Centro Sportivo Floriano Peixoto, after Floriano Peixoto, who was Brazil's second president, and was a Paraguayan War hero. Four years later, in 1918, the club was renamed to its current name, Centro Sportivo Alagoano.

In 1928, the club won its first title, the state championship of Alagoas.

In 1980, the club was the runner-up of the Brazilian Second Division. In the final, Londrina of Paraná state and CSA drew 1–1 in Maceió, in the first leg, and in the second leg, in Londrina city, Londrina beat the club 4–0. In 1982, the club was again finalist of the Brazilian Second Division. CSA was defeated by Campo Grande, of Rio de Janeiro. In the first leg, in Maceió, CSA won 4–3. In the second leg, in Rio de Janeiro, Campo Grande won 2–1. In the tie-breaker match, Campo Grande won 3–0. In 1983, the club reached the Brazilian Second Division final. CSA was defeated by Juventus, of São Paulo. In the first leg, in Maceió, CSA won 3–1. In the second leg, in São Paulo, Juventus won 3–0. In the tie-breaker match, Juventus won 1–0.

In 1999, CSA competed in Campeonato do Nordeste, being eliminated by Bahia in the semifinals. Eventually, Vitória, Bahia, and Sport Recife (respectively the winner, the runner-up and the third placed teams in Campeonato do Nordeste) declined successively to dispute Copa CONMEBOL, so CSA was invited to the competition. CSA, surprisingly, reached the competition final, but was defeated by Talleres, of Argentina. In the first leg, in Maceió, the club won 4–2. In the second leg, in Córdoba, Talleres won 3–0. However, the competition's top goalscorer was CSA's Missinho.

 The Mutange 
Mutange

The Mutange was inaugurated on 22 November 1922, having been considered for many years in the modern state stadium, including the only game with football matches, and was held in 1951 the first international game in Alagoas, O CSA 1 x 1 Club Atlético Vélez Sarsfield. Currently, the Centro Sportivo Alagoano started to play their matches in Estádio Rei Pelé Trapichão (property of the state government) and transformed the Mutange into a training center.

 The brand of rivalry 
The brand of rivalry. In the 1930s, CSA sent CRB an "invitation letter" to compete in a friendly game. The Pajuçara club accepted the challenge, but in "Oficio-respuesta" requested permission to include in its team some former players, since the game was friendly. The CSA, however, did not accept a proposal, this ignited a rivalry between the two clubs. Since then, as hostilities have increased, becoming uncontrollable, especially because explored in chronicles of newspapers, spreading statements of the two presidents. The newspaper "Correio da Tarde" published everything that said Osório Gatto of the CSA. The newspaper of Alagoas, in turn, published the remarks of Ismael Acioli of the CRB. And a simple "invitation" to a friendly match turned into a personal war. When he became acquainted in the chronicles, from a direct phrase of the blue president, Ismael Acioli judged and decided to take personal satisfaction. Warned by friends of the "Correio da Afarde" of the intentions of Ismael Acioli, Osório Gatto tried to prevent himself, armed with a revolver. The two president meeting was held in the middle of the Commerce Street of the Capital. Even before any dialogue, the CSA president pulled the gun and shot the president of the CRB. One of the hotels in the city of Ismael, with discount for all guests. And the war did not end there. While hospitalized, Ismael Acioli received unrestricted support from all factions of the club he led. So much so that unanimously, the entire regateana board publicly promised that if Ismael Acioli died, no blue-eyed board member would be alive to tell the story. Ismael Acioli recovered gradually, stayed to normal life. But got caught in one of the legs and a bullet that run. Only years later, the two sportsmen, in a fortuitous encounter, finally embraced with commotion, from the time of the two clubs are eternal rivals.

 1931 - The rivalry on CSA's birthday 
A growing rivalry between CSA and  CRB  culminated in a fact that occurred in 1931. To attend his birthday party, the Blues invited America's time from Recife to a friendly game. Tininho, a skilled player of the CSA, was also a true leader within the club. Often, it turns into time coach. For all these qualities, Tininho was respected by the leaders and loved by the fans.

With an intention to strengthen a team, Tininho invited two players from the CRB to join CSA in the game against America. Zequito Porto and Fonseca were the guests. They remembered and felt dressed in a blue shirt. On September 7, no Mutange, before the game, attended the locker room of the CSA, the players Zequito and Fonseca who were received by Tininho. The azulina board has already found itself in the chairs that stood in the bleachers of the Mutange. Upon learning of the news, the leaders sent Tininho to inform that he did not agree with the presence of the players of the CRB. They even claimed they feared a reaction from the crowd. Pressed on all sides, Tininho showed why he was a leader, and decided - "Either they accept Zequito and Fonseca or I will not play either." This statement added to the confusion. But because of the Azulino captain who took full responsibility, the two CRB players played and helped the CSA beat America by 4x2. Two of the goals were scored by Fonseca. Zequito Porto never denied that he was proud to wear a traditional rival shirt. A rivalry at the time did not allow such things to happen. But, he managed to break this taboo.

 1945 - 22 x 0: the great rout 
One of the biggest routines of Brazilian football and, certainly, a bigger one of Alagoan football, had a participation of the CSA. It happened in the league championship of 1945 - CSA 22 x 0 Esporte.

The CSA attempted to transfer the game to accept an invitation and play on Garanhuns. The  'Esporte'  did not accept. The control of field was of the team of Zé Rodrigues that took the game to the field of the Severiano Gomes Stadium | Pajuçara]. The CSA tried to take the match to the Mutange, even offering all the income for the  'Esporte' . The red club also did not accept. It was commented at the time that leaders and players of the Azulino club made a pact to make as many goals as possible within the game. In the week of the game, the Feather Court of the Federation suspended four players of the Esporte. They had been involved in the violent match against Olavo Bilac the previous Sunday. Leaders of the club of Zé Rodrigues came to think about delivering the points. They ended up giving up.

On 28 January 1945, at Estádio Severiano Gomes Filho, they played  'Esporte Clube Maceió'  and CSA. Zé Rodrigues, who had problems in the formation of his team, was forced to put in the field four athletes who had played in the preliminary match: Orlando, Foot of Samba, Mudico and Laurinho. Even so, the CSA players did not forgive. They made 7 goals in the first half and 15 in the second.

 1952 - The Game of the Xaxado 
The classic against the CRB of the afternoon of 1952 entered a history of Alagoan football and became known as "Game of the Xaxado". Xaxado is the name of a musical rhythm of northeastern Brazil and, at the time, it was a song of the moment of the stops of success. All Brazil danced the xaxado with Luiz Gonzaga.

The CSA beat their most traditional opponents on the score of 4-0. A great performance by the team made a blue crowd cheer and shout, rhythmically, a word "xaxado". Curiously, the CSA applied a thrashing just on no birthday day.

Players
First team squad

Professional Football and Board Department 2016Updated January 1, 2016:

 Titles 
 Professional Football 

 Featured Campaigns 

 Youth categories 

 Under-20 
  Under-20: 2012, 2013
  Under-20: 2005, 2010

 Under-18 
  Under-18: 2009, 2011

 Under-17 
  Under-17: 2015

 Under-15 
  Under-15: 2006, 2007, 2009

Symbols
The club's motto, União e Força, displayed in the logo, means Union and Strength. CSA's mascot is called Azulão, a type of bird.

1999 Copa CONMEBOL
The club competed in Copa CONMEBOL in 1999, and played the following matches:

First Stage

CSA –  Vila Nova 2–0; 0–2 (pens: 4–3)

Second Stage

 Estudiantes de Mérida – CSA 0–0; 1–3

Semi-Finals

 São Raimundo – CSA 1–0; 1–2 (pens: 4–5)

Final

CSA –  Talleres de Córdoba 4–2; 0–3

ReferencesEnciclopédia do Futebol Brasileiro'', Volume 1 – Lance, Rio de Janeiro: Aretê Editorial S/A, 2001.

External links
Official Site 
Arquivo de Clubes

 
Association football clubs established in 1913
CSA
Maceió
1913 establishments in Brazil
Campeonato Brasileiro Série C winners